Hamrahi may refer to:
 Hamrahi (1974 film), a Bollywood drama film
 Hamrahi (1945 film), a Hindi social drama film